Zhang Qiyue (born October 1959) is a retired Chinese diplomat who served as ambassador to Belgium (2005–08), Indonesia (2008–12), and Greece (2018–21). She is a member of the 13th National Committee of the Chinese People's Political Consultative Conference.

Biography
Zhang was born in Beijing in October 1959, to Zhang Shu, and Xue Runwu, both diplomats. In 1974, Zhang and four other students were selected and sent to the United States to study English, becoming the first batch of students from the People's Republic of China to study in the United States. Zhang returned to China in 1977 and entered Beijing Foreign Studies University.

After graduation in 1982, Zhang was admitted to the United Nations Interpreter Training Course, and then worked as a simultaneous interpreter at the United Nations headquarters in New York City and the Secretariat of the United Nations Office in Geneva. Zhang joined the foreign service in 1987 and was assigned to the Chinese delegation to the United Nations in 1995. 

At the end of 1998, Zhang returned to China and became deputy director of the Information Department of the Ministry of Foreign Affairs, concurrently serving as spokesperson for the Ministry of Foreign Affairs of the People's Republic of China since 26 January 1999. Zhang was the third spokeswoman since the position was established in the ministry in 1983.

President Hu Jintao appointed Zhang Chinese ambassador to Indonesia in August 2008, according to the 11th National People's Congress discision. She held the position for only four months; in December she was made . In August 2018, Zhang was named Chinese ambassador to Greece, according to the 13th National People's Congress discision, a post she held from 2018 until 2021.

Personal life 
Zhang is married to politician Liu Jieyi. The couple has a son.

References

1959 births
Living people
People from Beijing
Beijing Foreign Studies University alumni
Spokespersons for the Ministry of Foreign Affairs of the People's Republic of China
Ambassadors of China to Belgium
Ambassadors of China to Indonesia
Ambassadors of China to Greece
People's Republic of China politicians from Beijing
Chinese Communist Party politicians from Beijing
Members of the 13th Chinese People's Political Consultative Conference